Alison Caroline Bashford,  (born 1963) is an historian specialising in global history and the history of science. She is Laureate Professor of History at the University of New South Wales and Director of the Laureate Centre for History & Population. Alison Bashford was previously Vere Harmsworth Professor of Imperial and Naval History at the University of Cambridge (2013–2017).

Academic career
From 1996 to 2009, Bashford was a lecturer in history at the University of Sydney. She was appointed Professor of Modern History in 2009. Between 2009 and 2010, Bashford held the Chair of Australian Studies at Harvard University. Moving to England, she was Vere Harmsworth Professor of Imperial and Naval History at the University of Cambridge and a Fellow of Jesus College, Cambridge from 2013 to 2017. Since 2017, she has been Research Professor of History at the University of New South Wales and Director of the New Earth Histories Research Program.

Bashford has also held visiting positions at Warwick University and University College, London.

Bashford has published six books, including An Intimate History of Evolution: The Huxleys in Nature and Culture (Allen Lane, 2022) Purity and Pollution: Gender, Embodiment and Victorian Medicine (1998), Imperial Hygiene: A Critical History of Colonialism, Nationalism, and Public Health (2003), Global Population: History, Geopolitics and Life on Earth (2014) and The New Worlds of Thomas Robert Malthus: Re-reading the Principle of Population  (2016), and has edited seven, including Medicine at the Border: Disease, Globalization and Security, 1850 to the Present (2006), the Oxford Handbook of the History of Eugenics (2010), and Pacific Histories: Ocean, Land, People (2014). Her current work focuses on cosmopolitan histories of modern earth sciences.

Honours
In 2010, Bashford was elected a Fellow of the Australian Academy of the Humanities. In July 2017, she was elected a Fellow of the British Academy, the United Kingdom's national academy for the humanities and social sciences. She is also a Fellow of the Royal Society of New South Wales. In 2021 she was awarded the Dan David Prize.

Selected works

Besides a number of book chapters and peer-reviewed journal articles, Bashford has written or edited the following books:

Books written
Purity and Pollution: Gender, Embodiment and Victorian Medicine (Macmillan, 1998).
Imperial Hygiene: A Critical History of Colonialism, Nationalism and Public Health (Palgrave Macmillan, 2004).
Griffith Taylor: Visionary, Environmentalist, Explorer (University of Toronto Press/National Library of Australia Press, 2008). Co-authored with Carolyn Strange.
Global Population: History, Geopolitics, and Life on Earth (Columbia University Press, 2014).
 The New Worlds of Thomas Robert Malthus: Re-reading the Principle of Population (Princeton University Press, 2016). Co-authored with Joyce E. Chaplin.
An Intimate History of Evolution: The Huxleys in Nature and Culture, (Allen Lane, 2022). The Huxleys: An Intimate History of Evolution, (University of Chicago Press, 2022).

Books edited
Contagion: Historical and Cultural Studies (Routledge, 2001). Co-edited with Claire Hooker. New edition: Contagion: Epidemics, history and culture from smallpox to anthrax (Pluto Press, 2003).
Isolation: Places and Practices of Exclusion (Routledge, 2003). Co-edited with Carolyn Strange.
Medicine at the Border: Disease, Globalization and Security from 1850 to the Present (Palgrave Macmillan, 2006).
The Oxford Handbook of the History of Eugenics (Oxford University Press, 2010). Co-edited with Philippa Levine.
The Cambridge History of Australia, 2 vols (Cambridge University Press, 2013). Co-edited with Stuart Macintyre.
Pacific Histories: Ocean, Land, People (Palgrave Macmillan, 2014). Co-edited with David Armitage. 
Oceanic Histories (Cambridge University Press, 2018), with David Armitage and Sujit Sivasundaram.

References

External links
 Alison Bashford's website

Living people
1963 births
Academics of the University of Warwick
Academics of University College London
British historians
Fellows of Jesus College, Cambridge
Fellows of the Australian Academy of the Humanities
Fellows of the Royal Society of New South Wales
Historians of science
Academic staff of the University of Sydney
Fellows of the British Academy
Australian women historians
Vere Harmsworth Professors of Imperial and Naval History
British women historians